Gaspard and Lisa is a French-British animated entertainment series aimed at pre-school children. The series is based on the books written by Anne Gutman and illustrated by Georg Hallensleben. The series was made as a co-production between Chorion and animation company Impossible TV.

Overview
Gaspard and Lisa engage in various adventures and activities. Though they try to do good deeds, their behavior sometimes causes disturbance to other people, especially Mr. Huget (pronounced hoo-zhay). They say, "Uh-oh, catastrophe!" when they learn that they have created a problem, but "Yes, triumph!" when they fix the problem.

Characters 

This is a list of the characters in Gaspard and Lisa:

Gaspard's family

 Gaspard (voiced by Connor Fitzgerald in the UK and Peter Harris in the US): Gaspard is an anthropomorphic black dog who is the protagonist of the series. He wears a blue scarf, and lives in a high rise apartment. Like children his age, he attends school, and that school happens to be the same one attended by Lisa. Gaspard originated from a town outside Paris. He and his family moved to Paris a few years later. When he entered the Parisian school, it was there he met Lisa. He is also the newest member in his school. During his early days in class, he was a shy fellow whom the children laugh at because he brought a large bag with a lot of props. Thankfully, Lisa made him look special in front of them, and he got over his shyness. While he is a judo practitioner, Gaspard does have a slight fear of chickens.
 Charles: Charles is Gaspard's older brother. He is a chess enthusiast, and always wears headphones around his neck. Though he acts like a snob to Gaspard and Lisa sometimes, he also shows some acts of kindness.
 Gaspard's Dad (voiced by Simon Greenall): Gaspard's Dad wears a blue and green striped tie. He works as a newspaper columnist, and is even a competitive cyclist. He is also allergic to cats.
 Gaspard's Mom (voiced by Teresa Gallagher): Gaspard's Mom is a housewife and wears a purple pearl necklace.
 Granny Mathilde (voiced by Teresa Gallagher): Granny Mathilde is Gaspard's paternal grandmother. She lives in a blue house far from the city of Paris with a pet dog named Prince.

Lisa's family

 Lisa (voiced by Kisholi Perera-Merry in the UK and Charlotte Cohen in the US): Lisa is an anthropomorphic white dog who is Gaspard's best friend. She wears a red scarf and lives in the Pompidou Centre. Wherever Gaspard goes, Lisa is often with him, even on Gaspard's visits to his grandmother. She also likes to sing and dance, especially when it comes to cheering up Gaspard whenever he gets glum. Whenever she sobs, she sniffs, but sheds no tears.
 Victoria (voiced by Bessie Cursons): Victoria is Lisa's older sister. Both she and Charles share the distinction of being occasionally snobbish to Gaspard and Lisa, although Charles is slightly nicer. She also seems to resent Lisa when she pushed her little sister's books off the shelf or scatter the puzzle Lisa made. Her only compliment to Lisa occurred when Lisa learned to ride a bicycle without training wheels.
 Lila (voiced by Teresa Gallagher): Lila is Lisa's baby sister. She wears a purple onesie. A full-length episode of the series tells the story of when Lila was born and how Lisa was jealous at first but then began to love her sister.
 Lisa's Papa (voiced by Tim Whitnall): Lisa's Papa wears a gray jacket.
 Lisa's Mama (voiced by Teresa Gallagher): Lisa's Mama is a housewife and wears a green necklace.
 Lisa's Grandfather: Lisa's deep-voiced maternal grandfather wears a brown vest. He enjoys biscuits and is a bit of a magician. He also has a wife whom he has been married to for four decades.

Other characters

 Mlle Baladi (named as Mrs. Davis in the US, voiced by Linda Ballantyne): Gaspard and Lisa's teacher. She travels on a yellow bicycle. She also has a pet dog named Jean Claude whom she sometimes brings to her outings.
 Monseur Huget (voiced by Derek McGrath): An old man who happens to live in the same apartment Gaspard lives. He is often the brunt of trouble caused by Gaspard and Lisa's naivete.
 Bastian (voiced by Dallas Jokic in episodes 1-26 and Drew Adkins from episode 27 onwards in the US): One of Gaspard and Lisa's classmates.
 Adrian (voiced by Tyler Stevenson in episodes 1-26, Gage Munroe in episodes 27-44 and Drew Davis from episode 45 onwards in the US): A French boy of African heritage who is another one of Gaspard and Lisa's classmates.
 Erica (voiced by Nissae Isen): The only known girl at the school.
 Victoria (voiced by Camden Angelis): One of Victoria's two friends and the only one named. She gave a kitten to Lisa who in turn gave it to Monseur Huget.
 Madame Perrault (voiced by Katie Griffin): Mlle Baladi/Mrs. Davis's colleague who has a passion for art.
 Monseur Delphy (voiced by Richard Ian Cox): The pet store owner.
 Madame Merosh (voiced by Sonja Ball): The baker.

Episodes
The episode titles are spoken by either Gaspard or Lisa; each episode is approximately ten minutes long (with the exception of Lisa's Little Sister, whose length is about twenty minutes to end the series).

Crossover (2015)

Broadcast

Gaspard and Lisa aired on ABC 4 Kids in Australia, on TVOKids in Canada, on TVNZ Kidzone24 in New Zealand, on Nick Jr. in Southeast Asia, on CITV in the UK and on Disney Junior in the US. It also aired on Discovery Kids in Latin America.

References

External links

Official Gaspard and Lisa website (Japan)

 

British children's animated adventure television series
English-language television shows
2010s British animated television series
2010s British children's television series
2011 British television series debuts
2013 British television series endings
British television shows based on children's books
British computer-animated television series
French children's animated adventure television series
2010s French animated television series
2011 French television series debuts
2013 French television series endings
Television shows set in Paris
Animated television series about dogs
British preschool education television series
French preschool education television series
Animated preschool education television series
2010s preschool education television series